Ile District may refer to:

Ile District, Kazakhstan
Ile District, Mozambique